99 lugares donde pasar miedo is a Spanish TV program hosted by Lorenzo Fernández Bueno on Discovery MAX, about mystery and terror stories in Europe. The contestants are Spanish celebrities. It is shot in Czech Republic, Slovakia, Eastern Europe and Scotland.

The first episode aired on 27 April 2019 with Dani Rovira and Tomás García. The second episode aired on 4 May 2019 with Roi Méndez and Ana Guerra, where they visited the Loch Ness, Comlongon Castle and Greyfriars Kirkyard. The third episode was shot in Romania discovering the history of vampirism with the actor Fernando Tejero.

References

External links
 

DMAX (TV channel)
2010s mystery television series
2010s horror television series
Vampires in television
Loch Ness Monster in television